Rick Sekorski, alias Rocky Sekorski, is a retired heavyweight professional boxer from St. Paul, Minnesota.

Professional career
Sekorski made his professional debut on January 21, 1981, with a four-round decision win against Rick Kellar. He won his first 13 professional matches, losing for the first time to 41-5-2 Marvin Camel on May 21, 1983, in Billings, Montana. Sekorski won three more times before his next loss, to 11-1 Pierre Coetzer in Johannesburg, South Africa.  Sekorski continued to fight boxers of a high calibre, his biggest win being a sixth-round TKO of former world champion Leon Spinks in Detroit Lakes, Minnesota on August 2, 1986. Sekorski won the vacant Minnesota State Heavyweight title with a 3rd-round TKO against Percell Davis in August 1988, then lost a fight for the WBC Continental Americas heavyweight title to former WBA heavyweight champion Michael Dokes in December of the same year. Thereafter Sekorski would lose more than he won, concluding his career with a loss to Jimmy Lee Smith on November 22, 1993.

Sekorski also lost a fight to the returning George Foreman.

Sekorski compiled a professional record of 23-11 with 13 wins by knockout during a twelve-year professional career.

Professional boxing record

|-
|align="center" colspan=8|23 Wins (11 knockouts, 12 decisions), 13 Losses (4 knockouts, 9 decisions) 
|-
| align="center" style="border-style: none none solid solid; background: #e3e3e3"|Result
| align="center" style="border-style: none none solid solid; background: #e3e3e3"|Record
| align="center" style="border-style: none none solid solid; background: #e3e3e3"|Opponent
| align="center" style="border-style: none none solid solid; background: #e3e3e3"|Type
| align="center" style="border-style: none none solid solid; background: #e3e3e3"|Round
| align="center" style="border-style: none none solid solid; background: #e3e3e3"|Date
| align="center" style="border-style: none none solid solid; background: #e3e3e3"|Location
| align="center" style="border-style: none none solid solid; background: #e3e3e3"|Notes
|-align=center
|Loss
|
|align=left| Jimmy Lee Smith
|PTS
|4
|22 Nov 1993
|align=left| Mounds View, Minnesota, U.S.
|align=left|
|-
|Loss
|
|align=left| Craig Payne
|TKO
|6
|14 Sep 1993
|align=left| Atlantic City, New Jersey, U.S.
|align=left|
|-
|Loss
|
|align=left| Michael Murray
|PTS
|8
|28 Nov 1992
|align=left| Manchester, England
|align=left|
|-
|Loss
|
|align=left| Alex Garcia
|KO
|1
|23 May 1991
|align=left| Las Vegas, Nevada, U.S.
|align=left|
|-
|Win
|
|align=left| Rick Kellar
|SD
|10
|20 Mar 1990
|align=left| Minneapolis, Minnesota, U.S.
|align=left|
|-
|Loss
|
|align=left| Michael Dokes
|UD
|12
|9 Dec 1988
|align=left| Atlantic City, New Jersey, U.S.
|align=left|
|-
|Win
|
|align=left| Percell Davis
|RTD
|2
|2 Aug 1988
|align=left| Saint Paul, Minnesota, U.S.
|align=left|
|-
|Win
|
|align=left| Jeff May
|KO
|2
|9 May 1988
|align=left| Saint Paul, Minnesota, U.S.
|align=left|
|-
|Loss
|
|align=left| George Foreman
|TKO
|3
|18 Dec 1987
|align=left| Las Vegas, Nevada, U.S.
|align=left|
|-
|Win
|
|align=left| Joey Christjohn
|TKO
|3
|3 Jul 1987
|align=left| Gardnerville, Nevada, U.S.
|align=left|
|-
|Win
|
|align=left| Walter Santemore
|UD
|10
|9 May 1987
|align=left| Duluth, Minnesota, U.S.
|align=left|
|-
|Loss
|
|align=left| Adilson Rodrigues
|PTS
|12
|21 Dec 1986
|align=left| Sao Paulo, Brazil
|align=left|
|-
|Loss
|
|align=left| Francesco Damiani
|PTS
|10
|19 Sep 1986
|align=left| Lerici, Italy
|align=left|
|-
|Win
|
|align=left| Leon Spinks
|TKO
|6
|2 Aug 1986
|align=left| Detroit Lakes, Minnesota, U.S.
|align=left|
|-
|Win
|
|align=left| Inoke Katoa
|PTS
|10
|4 Jul 1986
|align=left| Gardnerville, Nevada, U.S.
|align=left|
|-
|Loss
|
|align=left| Jimmy Young
|MD
|10
|12 Mar 1986
|align=left| Bloomington, Minnesota, U.S.
|align=left|
|-
|Loss
|
|align=left| Jimmy Young
|UD
|10
|20 Jan 1986
|align=left| Marshall, Minnesota, U.S.
|align=left|
|-
|Loss
|
|align=left| Walter Daniel Falconi
|PTS
|10
|9 Nov 1985
|align=left| Buenos Aires, Argentina
|align=left|
|-
|Loss
|
|align=left| Pierre Coetzer
|PTS
|10
|13 May 1985
|align=left| Johannesburg, South Africa
|align=left|
|-
|Win
|
|align=left| Al Houck
|PTS
|10
|30 May 1984
|align=left| Mounds View, Minnesota, U.S.
|align=left|
|-
|Win
|
|align=left| Ken Arlt
|SD
|10
|12 Apr 1984
|align=left| Portland, Oregon, U.S.
|align=left|
|-
|Win
|
|align=left| Ernie Smith
|KO
|7
|3 Jul 1983
|align=left| Gardnerville, Nevada, U.S.
|align=left|
|-
|Loss
|
|align=left| Marvin Camel
|KO
|9
|21 May 1983
|align=left| Billings, Montana, U.S.
|align=left|
|-
|Win
|
|align=left| Ralph Rivas
|TKO
|7
|28 Feb 1983
|align=left| Edmonton, Alberta, Canada
|align=left|
|-
|Win
|
|align=left| Marty Capasso
|PTS
|10
|14 Dec 1982
|align=left| Atlantic City, New Jersey, U.S.
|align=left|
|-
|Win
|
|align=left| Broderick Mason
|MD
|8
|7 Sep 1982
|align=left| Atlantic City, New Jersey, U.S.
|align=left|
|-
|Win
|
|align=left| Lupe Guerra
|TKO
|4
|14 Jul 1982
|align=left| Saint Paul, Minnesota, U.S.
|align=left|
|-
|Win
|
|align=left| James Anthony
|KO
|2
|16 Apr 1982
|align=left| Amery, Wisconsin, U.S.
|align=left|
|-
|Win
|
|align=left|Jimmy Lee Jackson
|KO
|2
|25 Feb 1982
|align=left| Sioux Falls, South Dakota, U.S.
|align=left|
|-
|Win
|
|align=left| Akbar Abdullah
|PTS
|6
|20 Jan 1982
|align=left| Mounds View, Minnesota, U.S.
|align=left|
|-
|Win
|
|align=left| Al Houck
|PTS
|6
|30 Sep 1981
|align=left| Mounds View, Minnesota, U.S.
|align=left|
|-
|Win
|
|align=left| Leroy James
|KO
|1
|30 Jul 1981
|align=left| Gillette, Minnesota, U.S.
|align=left|
|-
|Win
|
|align=left| Solomon Dollison
|PTS
|6
|29 Jul 1981
|align=left| Mounds View, Minnesota, U.S.
|align=left|
|-
|Win
|
|align=left| Jim Hearn
|KO
|3
|6 Jun 1981
|align=left| Amery, Wisconsin, U.S.
|align=left|
|-
|Win
|
|align=left|Ingram Butler
|KO
|1
|24 Apr 1981
|align=left| Billings, Montana, U.S.
|align=left|
|-
|Win
|
|align=left| Rick Kellar
|PTS
|4
|21 Jan 1981
|align=left| Saint Paul, Minnesota, U.S.
|align=left|
|}

References

1959 births
American male boxers
Boxers from Minnesota
Heavyweight boxers
Living people
People from Marathon County, Wisconsin